Waters of Change is the second album by the Scottish progressive band Beggars Opera, published in 1971.

Overview
With respect to its predecessor Act One, Waters of Change features a rather different sound, which is less derivative of The Nice and Deep Purple MK I, and it is often described as the band's best work.

Track listing

Personnel
Beggars Opera
 Ricky Gardiner - lead guitar, vocals, acoustic guitar 
 Martin Griffiths - lead vocal, cow bell 
 Alan Park - organ, piano 
 Gordon Sellar - bass and acoustic guitar, vocals 
 Virginia Scott - Mellotron, vocals 
 Raymond Wilson - percussion
with:
Marshall Erskine - bass, flute on "Festival"
Barry Ainsworth, Martin Birch - engineers

References

Beggars Opera albums
1971 albums
Albums produced by Phil Coulter
Albums produced by Bill Martin (musician)
Vertigo Records albums